Erkkilä is a Finnish language surname, derived from the given name Erkki, a form of Eric. Notable people with the surname include:

Eeli Erkkilä (1909–1963), Finnish politician
Eero Erkkilä (born 1941), Finnish conductor
Mika Erkkilä (born 1990), Finnish ice hockey player

References

Finnish-language surnames